Col de la Croix (el. 789 m.) is a pass in the Jura range connecting Saint-Ursanne and Courgenay, both in the canton of Jura in Switzerland.

Cycle racing

Details of the climb
The climb from  Saint-Ursanne is  3.72 km. long, gaining 342 m. in height at an average of  9.1%. Several sections of the climb are well in excess of this with the maximum gradient of 17% being reached at the summit.

Tour de France
It was crossed in Stage 8 of the 2012 Tour de France on 8 July, where it was ranked as a Category 1 climb.  The first rider over the climb was Thibaut Pinot, who went on to win the stage.

References

External links
Le col de la Croix dans le Tour de France 

Croix (Jura)
Mountain passes of the canton of Jura